is a television program whose 12 episodes were broadcast on NHK educational television in 2009, and again on NHK satellite television channel two, and on NHK general TV in August of the same year, including a special edition. Series two was aired on NHK General TV in the fall of the same year.

The program introduces, in the form of a comedy drama set, daily events at a fictitious trading company named "ZENY", while introducing keywords and principles from economics.

See also 

 List of economics journals
 Outline of economics

NHK original programming